Xpression FM is a campus radio station for the University of Exeter, England. Formerly known as URE (University Radio Exeter), the station has been broadcasting since 1976 and is entirely run by students from the university.

History

Initiated by post-graduates, University Radio Exeter began broadcasting from Devonshire House on low power AM. Hours of broadcast were originally 5pm until 10pm with BBC Radio 1 carrying as a sustaining service. In the late 1990s it was deemed that, due to remote location, URE was allowed to use a low-power FM system. URE also became part of the Student Broadcast Network. The station was renamed "Xpression FM 87.7" at the start of 2001.

University Radio Exeter was founded in 1976, under the stairs of Devonshire House on the campus of the University of Exeter. At that time, of course, the only means of broadcasting was very low power, using induction loop aerials to broadcast to Halls of residence. Initially the transmitter was installed in the studio. This meant feeding a coaxial cable, carrying the RF signal, just below ground level from Devonshire House to Lafrowda halls of residence. This probably only covered 500 people maximum but seemed to work adequately for around 6 months, until 6 months of gardeners' spade abuse had reduced the transmitter cable to shreds. A rethink resulted in the transmitters being moved to the halls of residence, with the feed from the studio to the halls using cables leased from British Telecom.

In the late 1990s the rules were changed and certain parts of the country were permitted to use a low-power FM system. As an indirect result of joining the Student Broadcast Network (SBN), money became available to convert to low-power FM. Thus, at the start of 2001, the posters for "URE 963" were taken down, and replaced with brand spanking new ones, emblazoned with the logo "Xpression FM 87.7".

In early 2009 the station stopped using XFM as an overnight sustaining service and now broadcasts from the Exeter studio 24 hours a day.

At the 2011 Student Radio Awards, Xpression FM won their first ever gold award for Best Student Radio Chart Show. This award win was followed up by the station winning gold for Best Student Radio Chart Show once more in 2012.

The Committee Over Time:
Over the years, the committee structure has undergone various changes. In 2009/2010, the Head of Scripted Programming role was created to reflect the diversified content of the station. In 2011/2012, the Head of Sport position was added, following the growing interest in the Sports Team. A second Head of Marketing position was also introduced. In 2012/2013, the new Deputy Station Manager position was introduced to replace the Studio Administrator. The Deputy Station Manager deals with the administration and finances of the station. The new position also replaced the Programmes Controller as a Heads of Media Position. The second Head of Marketing position was reformed into the Head of Social Media in 2019/20 (and has since been reconstituted in to the original dual co-marketing format). In 2020/21, the two roles Head of Technology and Head of Training were formed into the one position of Head of Tech and Training.

Xpression FM News

Xpression FM has its very own in-house news team, led by students James Moses and Victoria Shipp. They produce student-focused news in the daily bulletins which are broadcast on the hour from 10am on weekdays on the station. Alongside that, the team also produces a show on Mondays (broadcast from 6-7pm) called 'ExeFocus' where contributors come together to discuss University stories, and stories from the local area. Past shows in the Monday slot have included: 'The Hot Seat', where interviewees have included award-winning author Anthony Horowitz and former Vice-Chancellor of the University of Exeter Sir Steve Smith; 'Limelight' ran in this role from 2019-2021, with a lighter, more magazine feel to the show. The second show of the week from the News Team, 'NewsHour', is aired on Fridays at 5pm, expanding on stories covered in the bulletins, as well as featuring exclusive interviews and longer-form reports. This show takes the form of a panel discussion, where student contributors present their opinions on the breaking stories from around the country and the world. The team has won many awards at the University of Exeter's XMedia Awards throughout the years for their commitment and subject coverage.

The Team cover breaking news events as they pop up throughout the year as well, with overnight coverage of the 2019 General Election and the 2020 US Election being notable recent highlights. On University matters, the station covers the annual Guild Elections, with a week of coverage dedicated to interviews, debates and the vote counts and announcements.

The Xpression FM news team have had many successful broadcast journalists as part of their team. These include the BBC's Ruth Lovell and Dan O'Brien, as well as Jon Kay.

Xpression FM Sport

Xpression FM also has its own team dedicated to sport. They air on average 2 shows a week covering all of the major global sports news. The Sunday Sports show, aired between 10am to 1pm on a Sunday morning has been a long stay programme as has Tuesday Night Sport (often referred to as TNS), aired from 7pm to 10pm on a Tuesday evening.

Headed by Sam Parks and Mikhail Shklover, the sports team can regularly be found occupying a 'Soccer Saturday' style vibe to the TNS Shows, and a panel discussion theme for the Sunday Sports Show, but there are also regular commentaries of BUCS matches involving the University team, and with press passes to some of the highest level sport in the city in both football and rugby union.

Xpression FM Music

The Music Team are closely linked to the Student Radio Association, and often collaborate with student musicians to hear what the community can offer musically. They often find themselves invited to festivals to report on the songs and artists there. The team have a show from 6-8pm on Thursdays where a panel of guests discuss their bops and flops from the week just gone, and play some of the chosen songs from the Heads of Music and the team behind them. Led by Alfie White and Aran Grover, it's always a buzz with discussions.

Xpression FM Drama

Running a weekly show on Saturdays, as well as featuring their termly shows on the radio station. Each of these shows tend to be written by students, produced by students, directed by students, and starring students - a real showcase. Headed up by Brendan Grimble and Justine Regan, there is always something brewing in the studio with the drama team.

Present day

Xpression broadcasts live from Devonshire House utilising three studios for simultaneous presentation, production and training. The redevelopment of Devonshire House led to a studio move for Xpression FM. Instead of broadcasting from underneath Devonshire House the studios are situated at the back of the building. The new studios include two live-to-air studios, a third (larger) studio for recording live sessions and group projects, a newsroom, a technology hub and a CD wall.

The station can be heard via a webcast (provided by Broadcast Radio) and through iTunes radio.

The Current Committee is made up of 17 students, and headed up by Station Manager Rhys Wallis, Deputy Station Manager Tom Picillo, and Programmes Controller Sungwook Kim. Each content team has their own heads (News: James Moses and Victoria Shipp; Music: Alfie White and Aran Grover; Sport: Sam Parks and Mikhail Shklover; Drama: Brendan Grimble and Justine Regan) who also sit on committee, where they are joined by the Head of Tech and Training: Ali Burton-Thorne, Heads of Station Sound: (To Be Elected), Heads of Marketing: Summer Wilde and Bella Judd, Head of Events: Kate Pygram, Welfare Secretary: (To Be Elected), and Social Secretary (To Be Elected). The Committee contains a mixture of students, from second year through to fourth year, and is elected from a pool of candidates in the third term of every year.

Awards and nominations

Student Radio Awards

Alumni

 Radiohead frontman Thom Yorke
 BBC's Jon Kay,
 Dr Chair Michael "Mikey" Peake,
 Sky Sports F1 presenter Ted Kravitz
 Smooth Radio Presenter Emma B.

References

External links 
 https://www.mixcloud.com/xpressradio/

Student radio in the United Kingdom
University of Exeter
Mass media in Exeter
Radio stations in Devon
Radio stations established in 1976